The acronym UHE may have different meanings:

 In astronomy and high-energy physics, it means Ultra-High Energy (refers to energies around the PeV).
 Kunovice Airport - IATA code
 Unhexennium, a hypothetical chemical element with symbol Uhe
 Uhe, a village in Estonia